Elmsdale (2011 population: 3,034) is an unincorporated Canadian village and community located on the boundary of Hants County and Halifax County in Nova Scotia.

Geography
Specifically, the community is divided by the Shubenacadie River, in the Halifax Regional Municipality.

History
Elmsdale owes its early growth to the construction of the Shubenacadie Canal and the Nova Scotia Railway. Demand for workers on these projects brought many new families into the area. One of the earliest was William Read who was granted  of land in 1785 at the confluence of the Nine Mile River and the Shubenacadie River.

In the next six years more houses were constructed near the crossing, including a hotel and a boarding house for railway workers.

The Elmsdale Presbyterian Church was completed in 1862. Its pastor, Rev. John Cameron and family came from Nine Mile River to live in the large residence he had built on the crest of a gentle slope overlooking the village. This house is still in existence and is currently The Briarwood Bed and Breakfast.

Below is an account of the History of Elmsdale written in 1917 by Hanson T. Dowell, a resident at that time.

In the year 1785 a grant of 1700 acres of land situated near the Shubenacadie and Nine Mile Rivers was granted to Richard Gibbins and others.  In 1805 Messrs. William and John Putman obtained this land and built a log house near the Shubenacadie River. The old post road from Pictou to Halifax passed on the opposite side of the river from the log house.  At that time this was the only road through the country.  Mr. Putman sold the property to Mr. Archibald from Pictou County.  He built a brick house near the old log house.  The next owner of the house was Mr. Charles Tremaine a wealthy gentleman from Halifax.  The barn on Mr. Thomas Logans farm now stands on the foundation of the brick house.  Mr. Tremaine carried on farming quite extensively for about ten or twelve years.  Through his influence a bridge was built across the river near his house.  Before that time, people had to cross in canoes or ford the river at its most shallow places. 
About this time other settlers came to the district.  Two or three houses were built about one mile and one mile and a quarter in a northerly direction from the brick house.  One being built by Mr. Tulloch of Scotch descent and the other by James and Terence Kenty of Irish descent.
Other early settlers were the Fisher brothers, who settled about a mile and a half in a south westerly direction from the brick house. 
The first schoolhouse was built about 1830 and the second one about 1850.  Then in 1865 a schoolhouse and hall were built.  The present schoolhouse was built in 1893.  The section only employed one teacher until 1904.  Since that date they have employed two.  The number of pupils enrolled in Primary room this year is 44 and in advanced department is 34, making a total of 78 pupils.
The older house still standing was built in 1852.  This place received the name of Elmsdale because of the large number of elm trees which are found here.  It is a good farming district having many acres of interval on the Shubenacadie and Nine Mile rivers.  Several of the farmers keep milk cows and send their milk to Halifax every morning and Saturday evening.  They receive 60 cents a can for it.  Nearly all the farmers raise enough hay for their own use.  The early inhabitants of the district went to Nine Mile River or Gays River to church and as there was no roads they walked or went on horseback, a distance of seven miles to Nine Mile River and ten miles to Gays River.  The first church was built in 1862.  The pastor was Rev. John Cameron who resided in Nine Mile River and preached in Gore, Rawdon, Kennetcook, Nine Mile River and Elmsdale.  He was pastor of these congregations for nearly thirty years.  His successor was Rev Mr. Layton, who was pastor of the Presbyterian Church at Nine Mile River and Elmsdale for seventeen years.  His successor was Rev. A V Morash who remained for six years and the next pastor was Rev. R Davidson and the present pastor is Rev. J A McKenzie.
The first manse was built in 1870 and the present one in 1885.  In the year 1861 a Methodist church was built, but was only kept up a few years.   
There was a tannery built at Elmsdale in 1867 and has been enlarged since that time.  It is now owned by N.B. Wilbur & Son.  The brickyards were commenced in 1858.  The steam brickyard began in 1898 or 1900.  
The railway first passed through Elmsdale as far as Truro Road crossing in 1855.  That is two miles east of Elmsdale station.  As there was no way to turn the engine around at Truro crossing the train ran up with one engine on each end.  One engine did the work going up and the other did it coming down.  The engines were named the “Joe Howe” and the “Grasshopper.” These engines being run by wood in place of coal, as is now used.  A farmer wishing to take his farm produce to the market in Halifax put his horse and cart on the train so that when he reached Halifax his cart was already loaded for him to drive to the market.  
The railway made more work and brought in more people, so that Elmsdale began to increase in size and importance.  A small hotel was started by Mr. McLean, also a store.  The hotel was next owned by Mr. Fraser.  Mr. William Scott from Gore then obtained the property and enlarged it.  Mr. Scott died in 1872, but the hotel is still kept by his descendants.
A great attempt was made to construct a canal along the Shubenacadie River that would admit the passage of schooners and other crafts.  This canal appears to have been originally planned by Lieutenant Governor Wentworth.  In a letter of his to Colonel Small dated May 27, 1794 he says, “Your territory at Kennetcook will be much improved by my plan of rendering the Shubenacadie navigable, and a communication to Dartmouth by a chain of lakes.”  Some years later this project was decided by a competent engineer to be not only practicable but attended with few obstacles.  An association was formed called the “Shubenacadie Canal Company” on June 11, 1826.  They commenced work the same year.  As it was supposed that the resources of the province would be developed by this work and that the public would also, in the event of war, be much helped by this navigation, they were granted the sum of 15,000 pounds.  After a large sum of money had been squandered on this childish project it was abandoned, and the present generation hardly knows that such work was ever begun by our forefathers.  
A lock was built on the river at Elmsdale and a small vessel sailed down the river to a point about two miles below Elmsdale.  The vessel got stuck in the shallow waters near the mouth of the Nine Mile River, but after a long time made its way to the Dartmouth lakes.  We who know the river at the present time cannot understand how anyone could ever think it possible to sail a vessel on its waters.
Elmsdale has a population of 425 persons.  Lumbering is carried on in the surrounding districts and is hauled to Elmsdale station and then shipped.
On the night of January 17, 1910 MR. J.A. Fishers’ carriage shop was burned.  It is not known by what means it caught fire.  This was one of the oldest buildings standing. 
Now there is three stores, three blacksmith shops, a barber shop, and a shoe making shop, hotel and post office.  Two daily mails are received and mail is carried from the Elmsdale Post Office to Nine Mile River six times and Carrols Corner three times each week.    
Note - This information may be freely copied with no restrictions.  Please do not edit the actual transcript.  Please feel free to add to the history.

Demographics 

Notable people
Hanson Dowell (1906–2000), president of the Canadian Amateur Hockey Association and member of the Nova Scotia House of Assembly

References

The River that Missed the Boat by Barbara Grantmyre, Halifax: Petheric Press, 1975 

Communities in Hants County, Nova Scotia
Communities in Halifax, Nova Scotia
Designated places in Nova Scotia
General Service Areas in Nova Scotia